Baby-led weaning (often also referred to as BLW) is an approach to adding complementary foods to a baby's diet of breast milk or formula. BLW facilitates oral motor development and strongly focuses on the family meal, while maintaining eating as a positive, interactive experience. Baby-led weaning allows babies to control their solid food consumption by "self-feeding" from the start of their experience with food. The term weaning does not imply giving up breast milk or formula, but simply indicates the introduction of foods other than breast milk or formula.

Background
	
Current infant feeding recommendations by the American Academy of Pediatrics are that infants should be breast fed for the first 6 months, then be gradually introduced to solid food between the age of 6 months and 1 year.  However, for much of the twentieth century, mothers were told to maintain a strict schedule for breast feeding, limiting the time at breast and the frequency of feeds. As a result, many mothers had low milk supply (as breast milk is a supply-demand phenomenon), and therefore their babies “failed to thrive.”  Infant formula became increasingly accepted as a way to supplement or replace breastmilk but there was also a move to introduce strained or mashed “baby foods” from a younger age than is now known to be desirable. By the 1930s, a variety of commercial purees were available for purchase, with Gerber leading the way.

Overview
Baby-led weaning (term self-attributed to Michael Barrientos) places the emphasis on exploring taste, texture, color and smell as the baby sets their own pace for the meal, choosing which foods to concentrate on. Instead of the traditional method of spooning pureed food into the baby's mouth, the baby takes part in family mealtimes and is presented with a variety of foods in easy-to-grasp pieces, which he or she can freely choose and explore. Infants are offered a range of foods to provide a balanced diet from around 6 months. Ideally, these will be the same foods that the rest of the family is eating, provided these foods are suitable for the infant. 

Infants often begin by picking up and licking or sucking on the piece food, before progressing to eating.  Babies are typically able to begin self-feeding at around 6 months old, although some are ready and will reach for food as early as 5 months and some will wait until 7 or 8 months. The intention of this process is that it is tailored to suit the individual baby and their personal development, and that the infant’s appetite is respected with regard to which foods are chosen, the pace of eating, and how much is eaten. 

Initial self-feeding attempts often result in very little food ingested as the baby explores textures and tastes through play, but the baby will soon start to swallow and digest what is offered. Although breastfeeding is the ideal nutritional precursor to baby led weaning (as the baby has been exposed to different flavors  via its mother's breast milk), it is also entirely possible to introduce a formula-fed baby to solids using the BLW approach.  Formula-fed babies can successfully wean using BLW.

Providing an infant with table foods initiates the development of strong oral motor control for chewing and swallowing, including tongue lateralization and eventual bolus formation. When an infant mouths a food texture, the tongue lateralization reflex forces them to move their tongue to the side to lick and taste the food, and engages the phasic bite reflex. Through continued practice, infants learn to volitionally lateralize their tongue and bite—the first step in the development of a munching/chewing pattern.

Basic principles
The basic principles of baby-led weaning are:

 From the beginning, the baby is allowed to choose what to eat from a selection of nutritious foods. Rejected foods may be offered again at a later date.
 The child is allowed to decide how much they want to eat. No "fill-ups" are to be offered at the end of the meal with a spoon.
Foods are presented in a variety of shapes, sizes and textures, to suit the baby’s abilities.
 The meals should not be hurried.
 Meals should be offered at times when parents are also eating, to set example and aid in learning through behavior mirroring. This also facilitates the development of language and social skills. Research has shown that when families eat the same foods as their baby/child there is less food refusal and pickiness.
 Sips of water are offered with meals, preferably in an open cup operated by the infant.
Iron and zinc are likely to be the first nutrients needed, so early meals should include good sources of these, such as meat, eggs and pulses.
 Initially, foods should be soft. Harder foods, such as root vegetables, are lightly cooked to make them soft enough to chew on with bare gums.
 If parents wish, non-finger-foods, such as oatmeal and yogurt, may be offered on a pre-loaded spoon so the baby can learn to self-feed with a spoon.

Relation to child development 
BLW is closely linked to the way in which babies develop in their first year, particularly in how their nutritional needs dovetail with their motor development.

Nutritional Requirements 
As recommended by the World Health Organization and several other health authorities across the world, there is no need to introduce solid food to a baby's diet until after 6 months. This guidance is based on research indicating that it is from this age that infants begin to need additional nutrients that cannot be supplied by breastmilk or formula alone. The time period from 6 to 18–24 months of age is when the risk of malnutrition is high in infants and the role of breastmilk or infant formula remains important throughout this period. It is important that parents do not decrease the volume of milk feeds until the baby is taking in enough solid foods to support growth (AAP, 2013). Formula or breastfeeding is continued in conjunction with complementary foods and is always offered before solids in the first 12 months.

By the time most neurotypically developing babies reach six months, their digestive system and their fine motor skills have developed enough to allow them to self-feed. Baby-led weaning takes advantage of the natural developmental progression of the child, both in relation to the age of beginning the transition to solid foods and to the gradual pace of this transition that happens when the infant is in control of the process.

Motor Development 
From infancy, the only oral motor pattern a baby knows is suck-swallow-breathe. This reflexive way of eating allows infants to feed from birth (from a breast or bottle) while protecting their airway and meeting their nutritional needs. The oral motor patterns required for eating and swallowing solids include tongue lateralization, tongue elevation, and munching/chewing, and unlike the suck-swallow-breathe sequence, coordination of these oral motor patterns is learned, not reflexive, although reflexes are present to allow a baby to begin to develop these patterns.  When an infant is offered a spoon of puree, the practiced or familiar oral motor pattern is sucking. Purees are thicker than formula or breast milk, but do not require chewing. They are therefore sucked off of a presented spoon and moved in the mouth in a similar fashion to liquid. This is generally seen as an integral part of the process of introducing solid foods and an important step in the acquisition of chewing skills. Conversely, professionals experienced in BLW note that effective chewing tends to appear sooner in infants who are not exposed to purees. The skills required for chewing are vastly different than those required for spoon feeding, and most babies do not need to be taught how to swallow. Swallowing is a deep brainstem reflex present by 15 weeks gestation  and well established by full term birth. Babies already know how to swallow--no need to practice! Interestingly enough, thicker textures are actually EASIER and SAFER for babies to swallow (think purees), and young babies who have swallowing difficulty are actually prescribed thickened milk to drink!  But purees do teach baby a motor pattern: bring food in, move it back, swallow. Because most solid foods require chewing before you move them back and safely swallow, learning to ingest purees does NOT prepare a baby for chewing.

Indeed, current research supports that delayed experience with eating lumpy foods leads to poor food acceptance in later years. 

Through playful exploration and handling food, babies learn about texture and are able to practice new oral motor skills without any pressure to eat. BLW also allows them to be in charge of what goes in their mouth, how it goes in, and when. Thus, they gradually develop the oral motor patterns required for mature bolus manipulation, chewing, and swallowing. The baby learns most effectively by watching and imitating others, while allowing her to eat the same food at the same time as the rest of the family contributes to a positive weaning experience.

Self-feeding supports the child's motor development on many vital areas, such as their hand-eye coordination and dexterity, as well as chewing. It encourages the child towards independence and often provides a stress-free alternative for meal times, for both the child and the parents. Some babies refuse to eat solids when offered with a spoon, but happily help themselves to finger food.

The originators of BLW assert other strategies which are in line with traditional feeding safety guidelines. For example, it is recommended that infants are seated upright, either on the parent's lap, or in a supportive high chair, for all feeding experiences. This allows for easy expulsion of the bolus by gagging, and decreases accidental movement of the food into the pharynx. Additionally, a child who has the trunk and head control to sit independently though a meal (proximal stability) will more likely demonstrate coordinated ability to move the tongue and jaw for chewing.

Gag Reflex 
When infants bring solid foods to their own mouth, they are the ones guiding the sensory experience, starting and stopping when they are comfortable and ready. When food does move too posteriorly in the mouth triggering a gag reflex, the entire bolus is expelled from the mouth– something that is not possible with a puree. Also, solid food moves slowly in comparison to liquid, and is not often sucked into the pharynx, which would allow for laryngeal penetration or aspiration of the bolus. The food bolus will trigger a gag response first and be expelled before it hits the laryngeal vestibule. Infants therefore utilize the gag reflex for learning three important concepts: the borders of their mouth, desensitizing their gag reflex, and how to protect their airway when volitionally swallowing solid foods. As infants get closer to one year old, the gag reflex moves posteriorly, closer to the laryngeal vestibule. This allows food to move closer to the laryngeal vestibule before triggering a gag. Parents following BLW are advised to avoid classic “choking hazards” or airway shaped foods: whole grapes, coin-shaped slices of hotdogs, cherry tomatoes, etc.

Scientific research 

Very little scientific research has been done regarding baby-led weaning. However, a study headed by child health specialist Charlotte M. Wright from the University of Glasgow, Scotland found that while BLW works for most babies, it could lead to nutritional problems for children who develop more slowly than others. Wright concluded "that it is more realistic to encourage infants to self-feed with solid finger food during family meals, but also give them spoon fed purees."

A more recent study at the University of Nottingham by Ellen Townsend and Nicola J. Pitchford suggests that baby-led weaning may lead to less obesity in childhood. The authors conclude that the "results suggest that infants weaned through the baby-led approach learn to regulate their food intake in a manner, which leads to a lower BMI and a preference for healthy foods like carbohydrates.". Feeding specialist, Kary Rappaport, OTR/L, SWC, CLE also concludes that a BLW infant, who leads their own food exploration and is exposed to a consistent variety of tastes, textures, and smells at an early age is more likely to develop positive interest in food. This may decrease “picky” eating behaviors in toddlers and young children.

Researcher Joel Voss, a neuroscientist at Northwestern University states, "The bottom line is, if you're not the one who's controlling your learning, you're not going to learn as well". When an adult takes control of the activity, the inherent love of exploration and discovery is lost. BLW allows for natural, developmentally appropriate interaction and play with food, which has the potential to develop a lifelong curiosity with food.

As of June 2019, it was suggested that long-term studies need to be done on the effects of BLW on nutrition adequacy and safety in addition to previous evidence that it is useful in self-regulation of feeding with low risk of choking.

See also
 Baby food
Breastfeeding

References
American Academy of Pediatrics (2013). Ages & Stages: feeding & nutrition. Accessed 10 October 2013. http://www.healthychildren.org/English/ages-stages/baby/feeding-nutrition/Pages/default.aspx.

Case-Smith, J & Humphry, R. (2005).  Feeding Intervention. In J.Case-Smith (Ed.), Occupational therapy for children (pp. 481–520). St Louis, MO: Elsevier.

Morris, S.E, & Dunn-Klein, M.(2000).Pre-feeding skills: A comprehensive resource for mealtime development (2nd ed.). Austin, TX: PRO-ED, Inc.

Rapley, G. & Murkett, T. (2005). Baby Led Weaning: the essential guide to introducing solid foods and helping your baby to grow up a happy and confident eater. New York, NY: The experiment, LLC.

Footnotes

Infant feeding
Breastfeeding